Days of Grace is a 2011 Mexican crime film written and directed by Everardo Gout.

Cast
Carlos Bardem - Victima X
Kristyan Ferrer - Iguana / Doroteo
Tenoch Huerta - Teacher / Lupe
Dolores Heredia - Susana

References

External links 

2011 films
2011 crime films
Films scored by Nick Cave
Films scored by Warren Ellis (musician)
Films scored by Atticus Ross
Films scored by Shigeru Umebayashi
Mexican crime films
2010s Spanish-language films
2010s Mexican films